This article include details of 2009 AFC U-19 Women's Championship qualification.

Group A 
All matches were held at Shah Alam and Kuala Lumpur, Malaysia (UTC+8).

Group B 
All matches were held at Kuala Lumpur, Malaysia (UTC+8).

Ranking of third-placed teams 

 Note: Myanmar's match against sixth-placed team Singapore was excluded.

Qualified nations 
 : Qualification Group A winners
 : Qualification Group A runner-up
 : Qualification Group B winners
 : Qualification Group B runner-up
 : Qualification Group B third-placed

Automatically qualified teams 
  (Defending champions)
  (2007 runners-up)
  (2007 3rd place)

References 

AFC U-19 Women's Championship qualification
Qual
qualification
AFc
2008 in youth association football